Nidhi Eoseewong (also rendered Nithi Aeusrivongse, Nithi ‘Īaosīwong, and Nithi ʻĪeosīwong; born May 8, 1940) is a prominent Thai historian, writer, and political commentator.

Biography 
Nidhi Eoseewong was born on 8 May 1940, to an ethnic Chinese family in Chiang Mai, Thailand. He studied at Assumption College Sriracha in Chonburi Province, and went on to earn bachelor's and master's degrees in history from Chulalongkorn University in Bangkok. Upon graduation, he accepted a position teaching history at Chiang Mai University, where he would go on to spend the majority of his professional career. He took temporary leave to continue his studies, completing a PhD from the University of Michigan in 1976. He retired in 2000, but has remained active in the academic community. He is an important contributor to the website Midnight University, and continues to publish and make appearances regularly.

Awards 
Honors include the Outstanding Research Award from the National Research Council of Thailand, the Siburapha Award, and the Fukuoka Asian Culture Prize.

Works 

 Fiction as History: A Study of Pre-war Indonesian Novels and Novelists 1920–1942 (Published by University Microfilms International, 1976) 
   [Quill and sail: On the study of history and literature in the early Bangkok era] (1984)
 Kanmueang Thai Samai Phra Narai [Thai politics in the reign of King Narai] (1984) 
   [Thai politics in the reign of King Taksin] (1993)
 Krung Taek, Phra Chao Tak lae Prawatisat Thai: Wa Duai Prawatisat lae Prawatisatniphon [The fall of the capital, King Taksin, and Thai history: On history and historiography] (2002). 
 Morng sathannakarn phaktai phan wæn 'kabot chaona, Sinlapa Watthanatham 25, no.8 (June 2004): 110–124; translated by the Regional Studies Program, Walailak University (March 2005) as "Understanding the Situation in the South as a 'Millenarian Revolt'"

References 

Nidhi Eoseewong
Nidhi Eoseewong
Living people
Nidhi Eoseewong
1940 births
Nidhi Eoseewong
Nidhi Eoseewong
University of Michigan alumni